Coutts and Couts are surnames derived from the Scottish Gaelic language. The names are derived from the Gaelic . The chronicles of the Coutts family reach back into Scottish history to an ancient tribe known as the Picts. The ancestors of the Coutts family lived in Cults in Aberdeenshire where the name can be found since very early times. There are many place names in Cromar and Upper Deeside named Cults/Culsh.

Early origins of the Coutts family

The surname Coutts was first found in Elginshire a former county in northeastern Scotland, in the present day Scottish Council Area of Moray, where they held a family seat from very early times.

William Coutts, a Coutts of Auchintoul, was a vassal of the Macdonalds, settled in Montrose, in the 16th century and became a provost of the town. The Coutts are associated with the Farquharsons.

People with the surname
Alicia Coutts, Australian medley, butterfly and freestyle swimmer
Angela Burdett-Coutts, 1st Baroness Burdett-Coutts (1814–1906), 19th-century philanthropist
Duncan Coutts (born 1969), member of Our Lady Peace
Frank Coutts (1018-2008), Scotland international rugby union player
Frederick Coutts (1899–1986), General of The Salvation Army (1963–1969)
Henry Coutts (1866–1944), New Zealand cricketer and soldier
Ian Coutts (born 1983), Founder of Commercial Real Estate Finance business, ICC Associates
James Coutts (footballer) (born 1987), English footballer
James Coutts Crawford (1760-1828), officer of the Royal Navy
Jim Coutts (1938–2013), Canadian lawyer and businessman
John Coutts (disambiguation), various people
John Willie or John Alexander Scott Coutts (1902–1962), fetish photographer and bondage artist
Joseph Coutts, Catholic Archbishop of Karachi
Marion Coutts (born 1965), British sculptor, photographer, filmmaker, author, and musician
Morton Coutts (1904–2004), New Zealand brewer and inventor
Paul Coutts, Scottish association football player for Fleetwood Town
Peter Coutts (cricketer) (1937–2015), New Zealand cricketer
Russell Coutts, (born 1962), New Zealand competitive sailor
Thomas Coutts (1735–1822), banker and founder of Coutts & Co
Walter Coutts (1912–1988), British colonial administrator and Uganda's last governor before independence
Wilfred Coutts (1908–1997), Australian politician

See also
Coutts, a bank
Money-Coutts, a surname
Coates (surname)
Coats (surname)

References

Anglicised Scottish Gaelic-language surnames